Liu Xiangming is a Chinese Muay Thai kickboxer.

As of 1 August 2020, he is ranked the #9 featherweight in the world by Combat Press.

Titles and achievements

Amateur
 2009 China National Muay Thai Championship 63.5 kg Runner-up
 2009 AMC Muay Thai Championship Winner
 2010 China National Muay Thai Championship 63.5 kg Runner-up

Professional
Wu Lin Feng
 2019 WLF China vs Russia 8-man Tournament Winner
 2021 Wu Lin Feng Global Kung Fu -67 kg Tournament runner-up
 2021 Wu Lin Feng Fight of the Year (vs Wang Pengfei)

Fight record

|-  style="background:#cfc;"
| 2022-12-09 || Win || align=left| Er Kang  || Wu Lin Feng 532, Final  || Zhengzhou, China || Decision || 3 ||3:00

|-  style="background:#cfc;"
| 2022-12-09 || Win || align=left| Zhang Kui  || Wu Lin Feng 532, Semi Final  || Zhengzhou, China || Decision || 3 ||3:00

|-  style="background:#cfc;"
| 2022-12-09 || Win || align=left| Shang Xifeng  || Wu Lin Feng 532, Quarter Final  || Zhengzhou, China || Decision || 3 ||3:00
|-  style="background:#cfc;"
| 2021-05-29 ||Win|| align=left| Thodkui Manas || Wu Lin Feng 2021: World Contender League 4th Stage || Zhengzhou, China || Decision ||3  ||3:00
|-  style="background:#fbb;"
| 2021-01-23 ||Loss || align=left| Wang Pengfei || Wu Lin Feng 2021: Global Kung Fu Festival, -67 kg Tournament Final || Macao, China || TKO (3 Knockdowns/Punches) || 2 ||
|-  
! style=background:white colspan=9 |For the Wu Lin Feng -67 kg Global Kung Fu Tournament title.
|-  style="background:#cfc;"
| 2021-01-23 || Win || align=left| Jia Aoqi || Wu Lin Feng 2021: Global Kung Fu Festival, -67 kg Tournament Semi Final || Macao, China || Decision (Unanimous)  ||3 || 3:00
|-  style="background:#cfc;"
| 2021-01-23 || Win || align=left| Meng Guodong || Wu Lin Feng 2021: Global Kung Fu Festival, -67 kg Tournament Quarter Final || Macao, China || KO (Straight to the body)  ||2 ||
|-  style="background:#fbb;"
| 2020-08-03 || Loss|| align=left| Wei Rui || Wu Lin Feng 2020: King's Super Cup 4th Group Stage || Zhengzhou, China || Decision (Unanimous) || 3 || 3:00
|-  style="background:#cfc;"
| 2020-06-13 || Win || align=left| Jia Aoqi || Wu Lin Feng 2020: King's Super Cup 2nd Group Stage || Zhengzhou, China || KO (High Kick) || 2 ||
|-  style="background:#cfc;"
| 2020-01-18 || Win || align=left| Peyman Ordouzadeh || Wu Lin Feng 2020: WLF World Championship in Baise || Baise, China || TKO || 3 ||
|-  style="background:#fbb;"
| 2019-11-30 || Loss|| align=left| Wang Pengfei || Wu Lin Feng 2019: WLF -67kg World Cup 2019-2020 6th Group Stage || Zhengzhou, China || Decision (Split) || 5 || 3:00 
|-
! style=background:white colspan=9 |
|-  style="background:#cfc;"
| 2019-10-26 || Win|| align=left| Rambo Petch Por.Tor.Aor || Wu Lin Feng 2019: WLF -67kg World Cup 2019-2020 5th Group Stage || Zhengzhou, China || KO (Spinning back fist) || 2 ||
|-  style="background:#cfc;"
| 2019-09-20 || Win || align=left| Li Xiaolong || Wu Lin Feng 2019: WLF China vs Russia, China vs Russia 8-man Tournament Final|| Moscow, Russia || KO || 1 ||  
|-
! style=background:white colspan=9 |
|-  style="background:#cfc;"
| 2019-09-20 || Win || align=left| Hu Zheng || Wu Lin Feng 2019: WLF China vs Russia, China vs Russia 8-man Tournament Semi Final|| Moscow, Russia || Decision || 3 || 3:00
|-  style="background:#cfc;"
| 2019-09-20 || Win || align=left| Farid Yadulayev || Wu Lin Feng 2019: WLF China vs Russia, China vs Russia 8-man Tournament Quarter Final|| Moscow, Russia || Decision || 3 || 3:00
|-  style="background:#cfc;"
| 2019-07-27 || Win || align=left| Masoud Abdolmaleki || Wu Lin Feng 2019: WLF -67kg World Cup 2019-2020 2nd Group Stage || Zhengzhou, China ||  ||  ||
|-  style="background:#cfc;"
| 2019-03-30 || Win || align=left| Meng Guodong || Wu Lin Feng 2019: WLF x Lumpinee - China vs Thailand, -65 kg Contender Tournament Final || Zhengzhou, China || Decision || 3 || 3:00
|-  style="background:#cfc;"
| 2019-03-30 || Win || align=left| Chok Yeong Jae || Wu Lin Feng 2019: WLF x Lumpinee - China vs Thailand, -65 kg Contender Tournament Semi Final || Zhengzhou, China || Decision (Unanimous) || 3 || 3:00
|-  style="background:#cfc;"
| 2018-12-08 || Win || align=left| Panpayak Jareon || Wu Lin Feng 2018: WLF x S1 - China vs Thailand || Thailand || KO ||  ||
|-  style="background:#cfc;"
| 2018-11-03 || Win || align=left| Kazbek Alisultanov || Wu Lin Feng 2018: WLF -67kg World Cup 2018-2019 5th Round || China || Ext.R Decision || 4 || 3:00
|-  style="background:#cfc;"
| 2018-07-07 || Win || align=left| Takhmasib Kerimov || Wu Lin Feng 2018: WLF -67kg World Cup 2018-2019 1st Round || Zhengzhou, China || Decision (Unanimous) || 3 || 3:00
|-  style="background:#cfc;"
| 2018-04-27 || Win || align=left| Audi || 2018 Kings League || Guangzhou, China || Decision (Unanimous) || 3 || 3:00
|-  style="background:#fbb;"
| 2018-04-07 || Loss || align=left| Khyzer Hayat Nawaz || Wu Lin Feng 2018: World Championship Shijiazhuang || Shijiazhuang, China || Decision (Unanimous) || 3 || 3:00
|-  style="background:#cfc;"
| 2017-11-11 || Win ||align=left| Jacko Nicola || Glory of Heroes: China VS Spain || Madrid, Spain || Decision (Unanimous) || 3|| 3:00
|-  style="background:#cfc;"
| 2017-09-23 || Win ||align=left| Katanyu || Glory of Heroes: Luoyang || Luoyang, China || KO  || 1 ||
|-  style="background:#fbb;"
| 2017-04-28 || Loss ||align=left| Cristian Spetcu || Rise of Heroes / Conquest of Heroes: Chengde || Chengde, China || KO (Punches) || 3 ||
|-  style="background:#fbb;"
| 2017-03-25|| Loss ||align=left| Subsakorn || Rise of Heroes: Hengyang || Hengyang, China || Decision (Unanimous) || 3 || 3:00
|-  style="background:#cfc;"
| 2017-02-18|| Win ||align=left| Sam Hill || Rise of Heroes 7: China vs New Zealand || Auckland, New Zealand || Decision (Unanimous) || 3 || 3:00
|-  style="background:#cfc;"
| 2017-01-01|| Win ||align=left| Abdulmalik Mueididor || Rise of Heroes 6 || Puning, China || TKO || 2 || 1:25
|-  style="background:#cfc;"
| 2016-12-17|| Win ||align=left| Manaowan Sitsongpeenong || Rise of Heroes 5 || Nanning, China || Decision (Unanimous)|| 3 || 3:00
|-  style="background:#fbb;"
| 2016-10-29|| Loss ||align=left| Manuel Fernandez || Rise of Heroes 3 || Changji, China || TKO (Knee)|| 1 ||
|-  style="background:#cfc;"
| 2016-09-03|| Win ||align=left| Eduardo del Prado || Wu Lin Feng || China || Decision (Unanimous) || 3 || 3:00
|-  style="background:#cfc;"
| 2016-06-17|| Win ||align=left| Sofiane Bougossa || Wu Lin Feng || Zhengzhou, China || Decision || 3 || 3:00
|-  style="background:#fbb;"
| 2016-05-07|| Loss ||align=left| Tepthanee Winai || Glory of Heroes 2 || Shenzhen, China || Decision (Unanimous)|| 3 || 3:00
|-  style="background:#cfc;"
| 2016-03-05|| Win ||align=left| Mohamed Didouh || Wu Lin Feng || Zhengzhou, China || Decision || 3 || 3:00
|-  style="background:#fbb;"
| 2015-12-05|| Loss ||align=left| Hasan Toy || Wu Lin Feng || China || TKO (Leg Injury)|| 2 ||
|- style="background:#cfc;"
| 2015-10-04 || Win ||align=left| Nuri Kaca || Wu Lin Feng || China || KO ||  ||
|- style="background:#cfc;"
| 2015-06-26 || Win ||align=left| Kazunari Kimura|| Silk Road Hero || China || KO ||  ||
|- style="background:#cfc;"
| 2015-06-06 || Win ||align=left| Johann Dederer || Wu Lin Feng 2015 Battle of the Century || Jiyuan, China || KO (Left Hook)|| 2 ||
|-  style="background:#cfc;"
| 2015-04-18|| Win ||align=left| Kim-Robin Leinz || WLF x DAY OF DESTRUCTION 10 || Hamburg, Germany || KO (Right Cross)|| 3 || 1:05
|-  style="background:#fbb;"
| 2014-06-29|| Loss ||align=left| Mahdi Mahmoudvand || Kunlun Fight 6 || Chongqing, China || TKO || 1 ||
|-  style="background:#cfc;"
| 2014-05-10|| Win ||align=left| Felix Minners || WLF x DAY OF DESTRUCTION 08 || Hamburg, Germany || Decision || 3 || 3:00

|-  style="background:#cfc;"
| 2014-04-26|| Win ||align=left| Roman || WCK Muaythai C3 || Ya'an, China || Decision || 5 || 3:00
|-  style="background:#fbb;"
| 2014-03-30|| Loss ||align=left| Dongsu Kim	 || Kunlun Fight 3 || Harbin, China || Decision (Unanimous)|| 3 || 3:00
|-  style="background:#cfc;"
| 2014-03-15|| Win ||align=left| Michael Boom || Wu Lin Feng || China || KO (Punches) ||  ||
|-  style="background:#fbb;"
| 2014-01-11|| Loss ||align=left| Damian || Wu Lin Feng || China || Decision (Unanimous) || 3 || 3:00
|-  style="background:#cfc;"
| 2013-07-28|| Win ||align=left| Chen Parker || Wu Lin Feng  || Zhengzhou, China || ||  ||

|-  style="background:#cfc;"
| 2013-05-03|| Win ||align=left| Dennis || WCK Muaythai C3  || China || Decision  || 5 || 3:00

|-  style="background:#fbb;"
| 2013-02-03|| Loss ||align=left| Xie Lei || WCK Muaythai C3 King of Fighting Tournament Final || Xichang, China || Decision  || 3 || 3:00 
|-
! style=background:white colspan=9 |For the WCK Muaythai Lightweight International Title -60 kg.

|-  style="background:#cfc;"
| 2012-10-21|| Win ||align=left| Yu Hyun Woo || Wu Lin Feng  || China || Decision ||3  ||3:00

|-  style="background:#fbb;"
| 2012-10-09|| Loss ||align=left| Changpuek EliteFightClub || Thailand vs Asia: The Best of Malaysia ||  Malaysia || KO || 2 ||

|-  style="background:#cfc;"
| 2012-02-04|| Win ||align=left| Auteuil ||   || China || Decision ||3  ||3:00

|-  style="background:#fbb;"
| 2011-07-16 || Loss ||align=left| Xie Lei || Wu Lin Feng || Zhengzhou, China || Decision (Unanimous) || 3 || 3:00

|-  style="background:#cfc;"
| 2011-04-23|| Win ||align=left| Zhou Hongzhang ||Long Xing Tianxia-WBC MUAYTHAI  || China || Decision ||3  ||3:00
|-  style="background:#cfc;"
| 2011-03-05|| Win ||align=left| Hu Yafei || Wu Lin Feng  || China || Decision ||3  ||3:00
|-  style="background:#cfc;"
| 2010-12-25 || Win ||align=left| Guo Kaihua || Wu Lin Feng || China || KO ||  ||
|-
| colspan=9 | Legend:

References 

Chinese male kickboxers
1994 births
Living people
Chinese Muay Thai practitioners
Sportspeople from Henan
People from Shangqiu